ELEAGUE CS:GO Premier is the fourth season of ELEAGUE that started on September 1, 2017, and ended on October 13, 2017. It will be broadcast on the U.S cable network TBS. The season features 16 teams from across the world competing in a season, which includes a regular season and a playoffs. The broadcast will be simultaneously available on the online streaming service Twitch and YouTube Gaming, but when on television, a limited broadcast will appear on Twitch and YouTube.

The season kicked off with FaZe Clan defeating Renegades in Group A and the first televised match of the season featured FaZe Clan defeating Natus Vincere. The season concluded with FaZe Clan defeating Astralis in the finals 2-0 as FaZe dropped zero games throughout the whole tournament.

Format
The format reflected that of ELEAGUE Season 2. A total of 16 teams will compete in the tournament. 12 teams will be invited and a four teams, two from the Americas qualifier and two from the Europe qualifier, will have to qualify for the tournament.

The 12 teams will be invited based on their past performances from the previous ELEAGUE seasons. Each closed qualifier will be played online and will be held from August 26, 2017, to August 27, 2017. One team, OpTic Gaming, would later have its invite taken away due to violation of ELEAGUE rules after roster changes.

The group stage featured four groups, making four teams per group. Teams will play in a double elimination group stage. The highest seed in the group will play against the lowest seed and the other two teams will play against each other in best of one games. The two winners and two losers will then play against each other. The winners match was a best of one and the loser's match was a best of three. The winner of the winners match will move on to the Playoffs and the loser of the winners match will play a third match against the winner of the losers match. The loser of the losers match is eliminated from the tournament. The last two teams in the group will play in a best of three; the winner of the match will get a spot in the Playoffs and the loser will head home. The top two teams in each group will advance to the Playoffs.

The Playoffs will consist of the eight teams. Teams will play in a single elimination, best of three bracket and will keep playing until a winner is decided. Each group winner will face off against a group runner-up in the quarterfinals. In addition, each team will not face another team from the same group until the finals if it ever reaches that point.

Qualifiers
A maximum of 512 teams each competed in the European and Americas qualifiers. Both qualifiers took place online and were completed within two days. Shown below are the top 16 teams of each qualifier, with two from the European qualifier and three from the Americas qualifier moving on. Teams played in a single elimination bracket.

European Qualifier

Americas Qualifier

Teams Competing
Eleven invited teams from will be joined by five other teams, two from each closed qualifier with an additional one from the Americas qualifier.

The twelve teams were invited based on their past results during the two Counter-Strike ELEAGUE seasons.

1 - ELEAGUE Season 2 champion OpTic Gaming had its invite taken back by ELEAGUE after the team replaced the majority of its players. Oscar "mixwell" Cañellas and Keith "NAF" Markovic stayed with the team. Tarik "tarik" Celik and Will "RUSH" Wierzba transferred to Cloud9 to replace Jordan "n0thing" Gilbert and Michael "shroud" Grzesiek on its active roster. OpTic signed former longtime Ninjas in Pyjamas member Adam "friberg" Friberg, former FaZe Clan AWPer Aleksi "allu" Jalli, and former North star Emil "Magisk" Reif. OpTic's spot will be filled in by a third team from the Americas qualifier.

2 - During ELEAGUE Season 1, Luminosity Gaming (now with SK Gaming) and SK Gaming (now with Heroic) were in a contract dispute. The Brazilians had agreed to sign with SK Gaming first when it was still under the organization Keyd Stars, but signed with Luminosity first during that time. In the middle of ELEAGUE Season 1 and some time prior to ESL One Cologne 2016, SK Gaming brought up the contract. After the two organizations came to an agreement, in which the Danes were released from SK Gaming and the Brazilians transferred to SK Gaming, ELEAGUE commissioner Min-Sik Ko stated that the transfer did "not comply with" ELEAGUE rules, thus resulting in the disqualification of the two teams.

3 - "N/A" indicates the team was not in the ELEAGUE season for any reason. Heroic was not invited to any open qualifier for ELEAGUE Season 2. Immortals was not invited to ELEAGUE Season 1 when it was signed with Tempo Storm. After Tempo Storm owner Andrey "reynad" Yanyuk said that a person associated with ELEAGUE and he had an argument, thus ELEAGUE not wanting Tempo Storm in the tournament despite being ranked higher than many of the teams. reynad later sold the team to Immortals to give the team a better chance at more tournaments and Immortals later qualified for Season 2. Team Liquid was upset by Echo Fox in the ELEAGUE Season 2 Americas qualifiers. Renegades was defeated by OpTic Gaming in the Americas qualifier for Season 2.

Broadcast Talent
Host
 Richard Lewis
Interviewer
 Sue "Smix" Lee
Commentators
 James Bardolph
 Anders Blume
 Daniel "ddk" Kapadia
 Auguste "Semmler" Massonnat
 Jason "moses" O'Toole
Producer
 Jason "Alchemist" Baker

Group stage

Group A

Group B

Group C

Group D

†Game was broadcast on TBS.

Playoffs

Final standings
The final standings, prize money distribution, and teams' rosters and coaches are shown below. Each team's in-game leader is shown first.

1 Immortals signed Vito "kNgV-" Giuseppe for the PGL Major 2017 after benching Lincoln "fnx" Lau. However, after placing second at DreamHack Montreal 2017, kNgV- went back to Brazil to clear visa issues. Counter-Strike 1.6 legend Raphael "cogu" Camargo took his place at ELEAGUE.

References

2017 esports television series
2017 first-person shooter tournaments
Counter-Strike competitions
International esports competitions hosted by the United States
October 2017 sports events in the United States
September 2017 sports events in the United States
Sports competitions in Atlanta
ELeague competitions